Boyne River may refer to:

Australia
 Boyne River (Central Queensland), river to the Coral Sea in Queensland
 Boyne River (Wide Bay–Burnett), tributary of the Burnett River in Queensland
 Boyne Creek (New South Wales), tributary of the Clyde River in New South Wales

Canada
Boyne River (Manitoba)

Ontario
Boyne River (Grey County)
Boyne River (Muskoka District)
Boyne River (Nottawasaga River tributary)
Boyne River (Parry Sound District)

France
Boyne River (France), a tributary of the Hérault

Ireland
 River Boyne

United States
Boyne River (Michigan)